Caroline Lejeune is a woman freestyle slalom skater in the IFSA (International Freestyle Skaters Association). She was three times world champion.

Biography
Lejeune started ice skating when she was six years old. When she was eleven she first tried inline skating which she practiced for a number of years. She remained in ice skating, also doing dance and artistic skating. In 2005 Lejeune devoted herself to inline skating. She was coached by Skali who taught her freestyle slalom. In 2006, she began seriously taking part in competitions.

Lejeune is currently (2010) the president of her club and in the Powerslide team. Formally she is no longer taking part in competitions but focuses on other aspects of the sport. She is still making videos and doing exhibitions. She is also very active within the IFSA. Lejeune resides in Montpellier, France.

Achievements
Only the most important events are listed

Images

References

External links
Official Caroline Lejeune website
International Freestyle Skaters Association website
Skali website
Powerslide website (in English - commercial)

1986 births
Living people
Sportspeople from Montpellier
Inline speed skaters
French female speed skaters